Capil Rabin Rampersad (12 September 1960 – 13 April 2007 in Port of Spain) was a West Indies cricketer who played for Trinidad and Tobago in the 1980s.

References

1960 births
2007 deaths
Trinidad and Tobago cricketers
Wicket-keepers
Trinidad and Tobago people of Indian descent